The Old York Gaol is a former colonial prison at Lindsay Road and Main Street (United States Route 1A) in York, Maine.  Its oldest portion dating to about 1720, it is one of the oldest prison buildings in the United States, and one of the oldest public buildings in the state of Maine.  It was designated a National Historic Landmark in 1968.  It is owned by the Museums of Old York and is open for tours between May and October.

Description and history

The gaol is a largely wood frame structure that has had a long evolutionary history of growth and change, and presently appears as a 1-1/2 story gambrel-roofed structure that is partial clapboarded, with sections of stone wall. About 1736 several first-floor chambers were added, including a kitchen, dining room, and parlor space that has a folding partition wall (added late in the 19th century), so that it be divided into two separate rooms. In  the second floor was added, with three cells and a central chamber. One of the cells, surmised to be intended for use as a debtor's cell or warden's room, is of noticeably finer quality. Around the turn of the 19th century a second stone cell was added to the first floor, along with an extension including a dining room, parlor, and bedchamber for the warden.

The original portion of the jail was constructed using timbers from the earlier York jail built in 1656.  The building served as the official provincial jail for York County (then part of Massachusetts) until 1760, when it was turned over to the town of York.  The building's last major enlargement was made in response to a demand for better conditions in debtor's prisons after an increase in debtors following the American Revolution.  After 1879 the building was used as a school, warehouse, and boarding house until 1900 when it opened as a colonial museum of relics. The Old Gaol continues to be a museum and reflects the jail and jailer's quarters as they were in 1789.

See also

List of National Historic Landmarks in Maine
List of the oldest buildings in Maine
National Register of Historic Places listings in York County, Maine

References

External links

Museums of Old York web site

Government buildings completed in 1719
Infrastructure completed in 1719
National Historic Landmarks in Maine
Defunct prisons in Maine
Prison museums in the United States
History museums in Maine
Museums in York County, Maine
Buildings and structures in York, Maine
Jails on the National Register of Historic Places in Maine
National Register of Historic Places in York County, Maine
Historic district contributing properties in Maine
Jails in Maine
Debtors' prisons
1719 establishments in Massachusetts